St. James United Methodist Church may refer to:

St. James United Methodist Church (Cedar Rapids, Iowa)
St. James United Methodist Church (Monroe, Louisiana)

See also
St. James Church (disambiguation)